Shannon Rayner (born 26 March 1984) is a Bermudian cricketer. Rayner is a right-handed batsman who bowls left-arm medium pace.

Rayner made his debut for Bermuda in 2010 in a List A match against Namibia at Wanderers Cricket Ground, Windhoek, during Bermuda's tour to Namibia. He later made his first-class debut in July 2010 in the Intercontinental Shield against the United Arab Emirates at the National Stadium, Hamilton. Immediately following this match, he made a further List A appearance against the same opposition, before making a single Twenty20 appearance against the same opposition, in which he took the wicket of Abdul Rehman in the United Arab Emirates innings of 178/7, with Rayner finishing with figures of 1/31 from two overs, while in Bermuda's unsuccessful chase he was dismissed for a duck by Saqib Ali.

References

External links
Shannon Rayner at ESPNcricinfo
Shannon Rayner at CricketArchive

1984 births
Living people
Bermudian cricketers